Khrystyna Antoniichuk or Khrystyna Antoniychuk (born 4 September 1990) is a former professional tennis player from Ukraine. Her highest WTA singles ranking is 172, which she reached on 22 February 2010. Her career-high in doubles is 279, which she reached on 9 November 2009.

On 12 May 2010, it was announced by the International Tennis Federation that Antoniychuk had committed a doping offence, and was suspended from participation in WTA and ITF events until 21 April 2011, after her sample was found to contain the diuretic furosemide.

Antoniychuk's last appearance on the ITF Circuit was in April 2010.

ITF Circuit finals

Singles: 6 (4 titles, 2 runner-ups)

Doubles: 7 (3 titles, 4 runner-ups)

References

External links
 
 

1990 births
Living people
Ukrainian female tennis players
Doping cases in tennis
Ukrainian sportspeople in doping cases
People from Kolomyia
Sportspeople from Ivano-Frankivsk Oblast